This is the list of episodes for Paddington Station 24/7 Series 3.

Episodes
<onlyinclude>

References

External links
 
 Channel 5: Paddington Station 24/7 (Series 3)

2018 British television seasons